In chemistry, 1,4-benzoquinonetetracarboxylic acid is an organic compound with formula , or (C6O2)(-(CO)OH)4, which can be viewed as deriving from para-benzoquinone  through replacement of the four hydrogen atoms by carboxyl functional groups -(CO)OH. 

By removal of four protons, the acid is expected to yield the anion , benzoquinonetetracarboxylate, which is one of the oxocarbon anions (consisting solely of oxygen and carbon). The same names are used for the corresponding esters.

Removal of two water molecules gives the compound benzoquinonetetracarboxylic dianhydride, one of the oxides of carbon.

The acid can be obtained by from durene (1,2,4,5-tetramethylbenzene) via dinitropyromellitic and
diaminopyromellitic acids.

See also
 Mellitic acid 
 Tetrahydroxybenzoquinone 
 Benzenehexol

References

1,4-Benzoquinones
Carboxylic acids